Sommerfeld tracking, named after German expatriate engineer, Kurt Joachim Sommerfeld, then living in Cambridge, England, it was a lightweight wire mesh type of prefabricated airfield surface. First put into use by the British in 1941, it consisted of wire netting stiffened laterally by steel rods. This gave it load-carrying capacity while staying flexible enough to be rolled up. Kurt Sommerfeld developed the track in the workshops of D.Mackay engineering based in East Road Cambridge. He worked on the design with Donald Mackay. 

Mild steel rods threaded through at 9 inch intervals gave it strength. The rolls could be joined at the edges by threading flat steel bar through loops in the ends of the rods.

Sommerfeld tracking was used extensively by the Royal Air Force in the Second World War to make runways at their airfields, as it could be deployed quickly. In addition, some 44,500,000 yards of Sommerfeld tracking was supplied to US forces by Britain in Reverse Lend-Lease.

Sommerfeld tracking was used widely on RAF and USAAF Advanced Landing Grounds, both in the UK and elsewhere.

Use
The ground was cleared and, if swampy, a layer of coir (also known as coco peat) or coconut matting laid down. The Sommerfeld tracking was unrolled over the ground, pulled tight by a tractor, bulldozer, or similar vehicle, then fastened to the ground with angle-iron pickets.

It would appear that this method did have some limitations and there are various reports of airfields being out of use during heavy rainfall due to mud, and the fact that the tracking would lift off the ground. There are also anecdotal reports of it causing damage to aircraft, such as wheels being torn off.

See also
Marston Mat

Notes

Bibliography

External links
Photo of Sommerfeld Tracking
United States Patent US2338785 showing Sommerfeld's design.
'Magic Carpets' Help to Keep our Forces Moving, The War Illustrated, September 15, 1944.

Airfields
Airport engineering